Argentine singer Tini has released four studio albums, six soundtrack albums, forty-three singles (including eight as a featured artist) and ten promotional singles. Tini first appeared in multiple tracks from the soundtracks of 2012 Disney's Violetta. The albums received multiple gold and platinum certifications in Argentina and various European countries. In 2013, Tini released "Libre Soy" as the Spanish-language version for Latin America of "Let It Go", originally performed by Demi Lovato for Frozen.

In April 2016, the singer released her debut self-titled album Tini (Martina Stoessel) trought Hollywood Records. The album also included the soundtrack for Tini: The Movie. It debuted at No. 1 in Argentina, as well as the top 10 in Italy, Germany, Austria and Poland. Spanish-language versions of each single from the album were also released. Upon its release, the album has selling over 100,000 copies worldwide in less than two months, and received Gold certification by the Argentine Chamber of Phonograms and Videograms Producers (CAPIF).

In 2018, Tini released her second album Quiero Volver. Tini made her chart debut on AR Billboard Hot 100 with the album's lead single, "Te Quiero Más", and single "Por Que Te Vas", that reached the top 20 on the AR Hot 100 chart. The album also spawned her single collaborations "Princesa" with Karol G, with whom she broke through US Latin Airplay and US Latin Pop charts, album's title track, a collaboration with Sebastián Yatra, and "Consejo de Amor" with Morat, that reached number 21 and number 33 on the AR Hot 100.

In 2020, Tini released her third studio album, Tini Tini Tini, which reached at No. 2 in Argentina and was certified double diamond by CAPIF, for sold out over 500,000 digital copies. The album includes her first AR Hot 100 top 10 single "22", and her first top 5 singles on AR Hot 100, "Fresa" and "Oye", making her the third artist with song in the history of the chart to achieve a debut at No. 3, and making her the only artist to score three top 10 hits on the AR Billboard Hot 100 in 2019.  The album also swapped her singel "Ella Dice" with Khea, that debuted at number 4 on AR Hot 100, making Tini's third top 5 on the chard, and "Un Beso en Madrid" with Alejandro Sanz, had reached number 19 on AR Hot 100 chard, while also reached at number forty nine on the Spanish Chard, making Tini's second song appears on the Spanish song chart.

In September 2020, Tini appeared alongside Lola Índigo on the remix of María Becerra's song titled "High". The remix peaked at number two on Argentina Hot 100, becoming Tini's fourth top-five single on the chart. The song also found its way on the Global Excl. US. In 2021, Tini achieved big international success with the singles "Miénteme" and "Bar", both debuted at No. 1 on Billboard AR Hot 100, becoming her first number-one singles on the chart, while also peaked at the Billboard Global 200 and Global Exl. US, making Tini the first female Argentine artist to achieve such success.

Albums

Studio albums

Singles

As lead artist

As a featured artist

Promotional singles

Other charted songs

Footnotes

Notes for peak chart positions

Other appearances

Videography

References

Pop music discographies
Discographies of Argentine artists
Latin pop music discographies